Aliabad (also Romanized as ‘Alīābād) is a village in Oshnavieh-ye Shomali Rural District, in the Central District of Oshnavieh County, West Azerbaijan Province, Iran. At the 2006 census, its population was 648, in 108 families.

References 

Populated places in Oshnavieh County